Snoddy is a Scottish surname. Notable people with this name include:

 Alan Snoddy, Northern Irish football referee
 Raymond Snoddy, British journalist and media commentator
 Stephen Snoddy, British curator of contemporary art
 Aengus Ó Snodaigh, Irish politician bearing the Irish translation of the name Angus Snoddy.
 William Snoddy (born 1957), American sprint athlete